American singer Frank Ocean has released two studio albums, one mixtape, 21 singles (including 5 as a featured artist) and eight music videos. Following the flooding and destruction of his recording studio during Hurricane Katrina in 2005, Ocean moved from his hometown of New Orleans to the Californian city of Los Angeles, where he sought to continue his musical career, eventually landing himself a songwriting contract. In 2009, Ocean signed to Def Jam Recordings as a solo artist. Ocean also formed a friendship with rapper Tyler, the Creator, leader of the Los Angeles-based hip hop collective Odd Future (OFWGKTA) and subsequently became a member of Odd Future, as well as making three guest appearances on the album Goblin, including the single "She". In February 2011, he released his first major project, his first mixtape Nostalgia, Ultra, which produced two singles: "Novacane" and "Swim Good". "Novacane" became his first single to chart on the US Billboard Hot 100, where it peaked at number 82. Ocean also made two guest appearances on the Kanye West and Jay Z collaborative album Watch the Throne, including the single "No Church in the Wild", which peaked at number 72 on the Billboard Hot 100. Ocean has also written songs for several artists, such as Brandy Norwood ("1st & Love" and "Scared of Beautiful"), John Legend ("Quickly"), Beyoncé ("I Miss You"), Bridget Kelly ("Thinking About Forever"), and Justin Bieber ("Bigger").

Ocean started writing songs for his debut studio album in February 2011 with songwriter and producer James "Malay" Ho, his friend and creative partner since their start in the music industry as songwriters. The album, Channel Orange, was released on July 10, 2012. Upon release, the album received universal acclaim from music critics, who praised the album for its bold lyrical content. The album peaked at number two on both the US Billboard 200 and the UK Albums Chart, while it hit number one on the US Billboard Top R&B/Hip-Hop Albums chart. It also became the first album in chart history to chart within the UK Albums Chart top 20 solely based on digital sales. Five singles were released from the album: "Thinkin Bout You", "Pyramids", "Sweet Life", "Lost" and "Super Rich Kids". "Thinkin Bout You" peaked at number 32 on the Billboard Hot 100, becoming Ocean's first top 40 entry on the chart. "Lost" became a top five single in New Zealand and also achieved chart success in Australia and Denmark.

After a four-year hiatus, Ocean returned by releasing Endless, a visual album that also marked the end of contract with Def Jam. Endless was released on August 19, 2016, shortly followed by the release of the "Nikes" music video which would be the first single off of Blonde, his second studio album, released a day later on August 20, 2016. Endless was a 45-minute-long album that intertwined the music with a video of Ocean eventually building a spiral staircase.

Albums

Studio albums

Mixtapes

Visual albums

Singles

As lead artist

As featured artist

Other charted songs

Guest appearances

Songwriting credits

Music videos

Notes

See also
 Odd Future discography

References

External links
 Frank Ocean at AllMusic
 
 

Discographies of American artists
Discography
Hip hop discographies